Fernando Molina Castillo (born 25 April 1965) is a Spanish lightweight rower. He won a gold medal at the 1984 World Rowing Championships in Montreal with the lightweight men's four.

References

1965 births
Living people
Spanish male rowers
World Rowing Championships medalists for Spain
Olympic rowers of Spain
Rowers at the 1992 Summer Olympics
20th-century Spanish people